XHCF-FM is a radio station on 93.3 FM in Los Mochis, Sinaloa. It is owned by Radiosistema del Noroeste and is known as La Mexicana.

History
XECF-AM received its concession on February 28, 1940, operating on 1410 kHz. It was owned by Francisco Pérez H., sold to La Voz del Valle del Fuerte, S.A. in 1956, and then was acquired by Francisco Pérez Alvarado in 1965. The current concessionaire was created in 1977, and in the 1990s, XECF increased its power to 10,000 watts during the day.

XHCF-FM was authorized in 2010 and permitted to increase its effective radiated power from 4 kW to 25 in 2015.

References

Radio stations in Sinaloa
Radio stations established in 1940